Naserabad (also Romanized as Nāşerābād; also known as Naser Abad Mehraban and Nāsirābād) is a village in Sardaran Rural District, in the Central District of Kabudarahang County, Hamadan Province, Iran. At the 2006 census, its population was 450, in 115 families.

References 

Populated places in Kabudarahang County